Ələsgərli is a village and municipality in the Tartar Rayon of Azerbaijan. It has a population of 1,105.

References

Populated places in Tartar District